Sridevika is an Indian actress who has appeared in the Tamil, Telugu, Malayalam and Kannada film industries.

Early days
Sridevika was born in Palakkad, Kerala. She married Rohit Ramachandran, an airline pilot, in March 2010.

Her entrance in Tamil films by pairing opposite Jai Akash in Agathiyan's Ramakrishna (2004) and then opposite Ramana in Anda Naal Nyabagam (2005). She subsequently went on to appear in Telugu films like Rajababu, Malayalam films such as Avan Chandiyude Makan (2007), Parthan Kanda Paralokam (2008) and "Manjadikuru" (2012), and Kannada films including My Autograph (2006) opposite Sudeep. Currently she is directing a Malayalam web series called Random Wekaram

Filmography
Films

References

Living people
Actresses in Tamil cinema
21st-century Indian actresses
Actresses in Telugu cinema
Indian film actresses
Actresses in Malayalam cinema
Actresses in Kannada cinema
Actresses from Tamil Nadu
1984 births